Anastasia Dețiuc and Johana Marková were the defending champions but chose to participate with different partners. Dețiuc partnered alongside Yana Sizikova but lost in the first round to Isabelle Haverlag and Alexandra Ignatik. Marková partnered with Denisa Hindová, but lost in the quarterfinals to Miriam Kolodziejová and Jesika Malečková.

Kolodziejová and Malečková went on to win the title, defeating Kanako Morisaki and Erika Sema in the final, 6–3, 1–6, [10–2].

Seeds

Draw

Draw

References
Main Draw

Kuchyně Gorenje Prague Open - Doubles